The WDR paper computer or Know-how Computer is an educational model of a computer consisting only of a pen, a sheet of paper, and individual matches in the most simple case. This allows anyone interested to learn how to program without having an electronic computer at their disposal.

The paper computer was created in the early 1980s when computer access was not yet widespread in Germany, to allow people to familiarize themselves with basic computer operation and assembly-like programming languages. It was distributed in over  copies and at its time belonged to the computers with the widest circulation.

The original printed version of the paper computer has up to 21 lines of code on the left and eight registers on the right, which are represented as boxes that contain as many matches as the value in the corresponding register. A pen is used to indicate the line of code which is about to be executed. The user steps through the program, adding and subtracting matches from the appropriate registers and following program flow until the stop instruction is encountered.

The instruction set of five commands is small but Turing complete and therefore enough to represent all mathematical functions: incrementing ("inc") or decrementing ("dec") a register, unconditional jump ("jmp"), conditional jump ("isz", skips next instruction if a register is zero), and stopping program execution ("stp").

An emulator for Windows is available on Wolfgang Back's website, but a JavaScript emulator also exists. Emulators place fewer restrictions on line count or the number of registers, allowing longer and more complex programs.

The paper computer's method of operation is nominally based on a register machine by Elmar Cohors-Fresenborg, but follows more the approach of John Cedric Shepherdson and Howard E. Sturgis in their Shepherdson–Sturgis register machine model.

A derived version of the paper computer is used as a "Know-How Computer" in Namibian school education.

See also
 Digi-Comp I
 Digi-Comp II
 Geniac
 CARDboard Illustrative Aid to Computation
 Turing Tumble
 Little man computer

References

Further reading
  
   
  (NB. Javascript implementation of a paper computer)
 
 

Computers
German inventions
1983 in computing
Models of computation
Educational abstract machines
Educational programming languages